The 1925 Santa Clara Broncos football team was an American football team that represented Santa Clara University as an independent during the 1925 college football season. In their first season under head coach Adam Walsh, the Broncos compiled a 2–6 record and were outscored by opponents by a total of 126 to 58.

Schedule

References

Santa Clara
Santa Clara Broncos football seasons
Santa Clara Broncos football